Old College, Aberystwyth is a building that forms part of the University of Aberystwyth in Aberystwyth, Ceredigion, Wales. It was built in 1795 by John Nash and is a Grade I listed building.

History 
Before the Old College, Castle House stood in its location on Aberystwyth's seafront. In 1795, John Nash replaced Castle House with Old College. He hired George Jones as the architect to build the Old College, which he did quickly in the Gothic style. In 1864 it was purchased by Thomas Savin who wanted to turn it into a hotel but was forced to abandon the project a year later due to financial troubles. From there it was sold in 1872 for £10,000, £70,000 below its original cost price, to the University of Wales who turned it into a college for higher education which later became the University of Aberystwyth.

In 1885, the building was damaged by fire and only survived through the University's board paying for repairs as public funds were not available. During the renovation J P Seddon, the architect hired to carry out the reconstitution, was sacked because the University were concerned that his plans would prove too expensive. This was because Seddon despised the original design of the building and wanted to make it more intricate but was fired before he was able to complete it.

The Old College remained the main campus in Aberystwyth until the 1960s when the majority of teaching was moved to the Penglais campus near the National Library of Wales. Despite this, administration of Aberystwyth University remained at the Old College along with the teaching of Education and Welsh. In 2012, plans were made for the Old College to become a new postgraduate centre as a part of a new cultural quarter in Aberystwyth. In 2015, the University applied for £19 million of Heritage Lottery Funding to allow for the renovation of the Old College.

Listing 
In 1961 the Old College was granted listed Grade I status. The reason for it being listed is because it was a "...particularly important example of that style so loved by wealthy Victorian patrons and so imaginatively created by architects of the period".

Gallery

References 

Aberystwyth University
Grade I listed buildings in Ceredigion
Gothic Revival architecture in Wales